Nine days may refer to:

Religion
The Nine Days in Judaism

Books
The Nine Days, account of the General Strike by A. J. Cook 1926
Nine Days, novel by Toni Jordan 2012
Nine Days, novel by Fred Hiatt 2013
Nine Days to Christmas, children's book by Marie Hall Ets and Aurora Labastida 1959
Nine Days a Queen - The Short Life and Reign of Lady Jane Grey by Ann Rinaldi 2005
The Nine days of Dunkirk, by David Divine 1959
Last Nine Days of the Bismarck, by C.S. Forester 1959

Film and TV
 "9 Days" (Brooklyn Nine-Nine), an episode of U.S. sitcom Brooklyn Nine-Nine.
 Nine Days (film), a science fiction film
 Nine Days in One Year, a 1962 Soviet drama film directed by Mikhail Romm
 Nine Days that Changed the World, a 2010 documentary film produced by Newt Gingrich

Music
Nine Days, American rock band

See also
Nine Days Wonder (disambiguation)